Michael Müller (born 10 July 1948) is a German politician of the Social Democratic Party (SPD) and former member of the German Bundestag.

Life 
Müller has been a member of the SPD since 1966. From 1972 to 1978 he was deputy federal chairman of the Young Socialists. From 1983 to 2009 he was a member of the German Bundestag. He was a directly elected member of parliament for the constituency of Düsseldorf I in the 1998 and 2002 federal elections and otherwise entered the Bundestag via the North Rhine-Westphalia state list. From 23 November 2005 to 27 October 2009 he was Parliamentary State Secretary to the Federal Minister for the Environment, Nature Conservation and Nuclear Safety.

Literature

References

1948 births
Members of the Bundestag for North Rhine-Westphalia
Members of the Bundestag 2005–2009
Members of the Bundestag 2002–2005
Members of the Bundestag 1998–2002
Members of the Bundestag 1994–1998
Members of the Bundestag 1990–1994
Members of the Bundestag 1987–1990
Members of the Bundestag 1983–1987
Members of the Bundestag for the Social Democratic Party of Germany
Living people